Kenneth Dimbleby (23 October 1914 – 2 September 2006) was a South African cricketer. He played in twenty-eight first-class matches from 1933/34 to 1952/53.

References

External links
 

1914 births
2006 deaths
South African cricketers
Eastern Province cricketers
Western Province cricketers
Cricketers from Cape Town